Rouse Hill railway station is an elevated rapid transit station built by the Metro Trains Sydney consortium at the Rouse Hill Town Centre in Sydney, Australia. The project forms part of Transport for New South Wales's $8.3 billion Sydney Metro Northwest scheme. Rouse Hill Station is one of two Metro stops in the suburb: the other, Tallawong, is a few kilometres to the west.

From 26 May 2019, Rouse Hill Station provides frequent train services to Chatswood. In later years, as the metro network expands, the Government intends to run trains to the Sydney central business district, Bankstown and Marsden Park.

Background 
Then-rural Rouse Hill was identified by Sydney's 1988 metropolitan strategy, Sydney Into Its Third Century, as an area for future development. Under the previous 1968 strategy, new Western Sydney suburbs could only be formed within the broad corridors formed by the suburban rail system. In approving Sydney Into Its Third Century, Planning Minister Bob Carr abolished this guideline: henceforth new areas such as Rouse Hill could be developed far from rail lines, provided space was left for future transport infrastructure.

A decade later, as the region began to grow, Carr had risen to become premier, and sought solutions to the new suburbs' transport problems. The Government's public transport strategy, Action for Transport 2010, released in 1998, proposed a new railway line from the existing suburban network at Epping to Castle Hill. From Castle Hill, the plan said, passengers would change onto a new bus rapid transit system, to be built using the district's hitherto-vacant transport corridors. Both the Castle Hill rail and busway projects were promised for 2010: only the busway eventuated, and only in part.

The 1998 plan listed the extension of the Castle Hill line to Rouse Hill as a priority for the decade 2010-20. From then on, a Rouse Hill Station appeared in successive north-western rail proposals, including the "Long-Term Plan for Rail" in 2001, the Metropolitan Rail Expansion Plan in 2005, and a short-lived metro proposal in 2008. As of 2011, nothing had been built besides the Rouse Hill to Parramatta section of the busway network.

Following a change of government, work on the North West Rail Link commenced in 2013.

Design and construction 

Under its $3.7 billion "Operations, Trains and Systems" contract with Transport for NSW, NRT is responsible for the design, construction, fit-out and operation of the new station.

The station is located just to the south of the Windsor Road rail bridge. This structure, a cable-stayed suspension bridge designed by Italian civil firm Salini Impregilo, is a visual icon for the district. Both opened 26 May 2019.

Services

Rouse Hill has two side platforms. It is served by Metro North West Line services. Rouse Hill station is served by a number of bus routes operated by Busways and Hillsbus.

References

External links
 Rouse Hill Station at Transport for NSW (Archived 12 June 2019)

Easy Access railway stations in Sydney
Railway stations in Australia opened in 2019
Sydney Metro stations
The Hills Shire
Rouse Hill, New South Wales